Gurpartap Singh Wadala  is an Indian politician and belongs to the Shiromani Akali Dal. He is a member of Punjab Legislative Assembly and represent Nakodar. He is son of former Akali MLA Kuldip Singh Wadala.

Educational qualification
Wadala did B.E. (Electrical) from Guru Nanak Engineering College Ludhiana.

Political career
Wadala was elected to Punjab Legislative Assembly from Nakodar in 2012. He replaced his father as Akali Dal candidate from Nakodar.

In 2017 Elections he won the Nakodar Assembly seat by defeating Congress candidate Jagbir Singh Brar and AAP candidate Sarwan Singh Hayer, hence winning his second assembly election in as many attempts. Earlier in 2012, he had defeated Amarjit Singh Samra who was elected to the Punjab Legislative Assembly in 1994 in by election from Nakodar. and remained undefeated in 1997, 2002 and 2007 assembly elections as well.

References

Living people
Indian Sikhs
Punjab, India MLAs 2012–2017
Year of birth missing (living people)
Place of birth missing (living people)
Shiromani Akali Dal politicians
People from Jalandhar district
Punjab, India MLAs 2017–2022